Ernestine Pollards (January 19, 1942 – January 22, 2014) was an American sprinter. She competed in the women's 200 metres at the 1960 Summer Olympics.

References

External links
 

1942 births
2014 deaths
Athletes (track and field) at the 1960 Summer Olympics
American female sprinters
Olympic track and field athletes of the United States
Track and field athletes from Chicago
Olympic female sprinters
21st-century American women